Da Liu Ren is a form of Chinese calendrical astrology dating from the later Warring States period. It is also a member of the Three Styles of divination, along with Qi Men Dun Jia and Taiyi.

Li Yang describes Da Liu Ren as the highest form of divination in China. This divination form is called Da Liu Ren because the heavenly stem rén, indicating "yang water", appears six times in the Sexagenary cycle. In order, it appears in rénshēn, rénwǔ, rénchén, rényín, rénzǐ, and rénxū.

In the words of a contemporary Chinese master of Da Liu Ren, the six rén indicate an entire movement of the sexagenary cycle, during which an something may appear, rise to maturity and then decline and disappear. Thus the six rén indicate the life cycle of phenomena. There is a homonym in the Chinese language which carries the meaning of pregnancy, and so the six rén also carry the meaning of the birth of a phenomenon.

Instrument

The diviner's board (shi) used for the Three Styles differ markedly. The Qi Men Dun Jia divinor's board consists of a 3 × 3 magic square, while the Tai Yi board is somewhat larger, and may be drawn as either a square or circle. The Da Liu Ren cosmic board contains positions for the Earth pan and Heaven pan, which hold the twelve Earthly Branches and the twelve spirits. In addition, the Da Liu Ren cosmic board indicates the Three Transmissions and Four Classes.

A shi (also known as a  astrolabe) from the Six Dynasties period (222–589 CE) consists of a Heaven Plate placed over an Earth Plate. On the Earth Plate are three groups of inscriptions:
Outer band: 36 animals (12 associated with the earthly branches, plus the 28 animals associated with the xiù or lunar mansions)
Middle band: 28 xiù lunar mansions
Inner ring: Stems and Branches (ganzhi).

The square plate is divided diagonally into four sections that allocate 9 animals, 7 xiu, and 5 ganzhi to a section. A diviner examined current sky phenomena to set the board and adjust their position in relation to the board.

A modern version of the Da Liu Ren cosmic board places the Three Transmissions at the top of the board, along with the corresponding Earth Branch and any pertinent vacancies. The Four Classes are placed below the Three Transmissions, with the Heaven Pan and Earth Pan positions clearly indicated below the corresponding spirit position. A diagram of the Heaven Pan positions of the twelve generals and their corresponding Earth Branch positions in the Heaven Pan completes the illustration. The Earth pan is not depicted. The sexagenary cycle date is given in the upper right–hand margin, with the corresponding situation number, the location of pertinent vacancies, and an indication of whether the array belongs to daytime or evening divination. The structured situation types for each array are provided in the left-hand margin. In some versions, an annotated description of the major aspects of each situation is provided. The description is often taken from the body of classical literature about Da Liu Ren.

Technique

Divination in Da Liu Ren is determined by relationships of five elements (wu xing ) and yin and yang between and among the Three Transmissions, Four Classes, Twelve Generals, and the Heaven and Earth Plates. Each double-hour of the day contains a cosmic board for daytime and evening divination. The Three Transmissions are derived from configurations of the Heavenly Stem and Earthly Branch of the date. The Four Classes are determined in a similar manner.

Qi Men Dun Jia was widely used in China during the Tang and Song dynasties. By the time of the Yuan dynasty, Da Liu Ren had overtaken Qi Men Dun Jia in popularity, at least according to source documents found in the caverns of Dunhuang. The overwhelming popularity of Da Liu Ren in ancient China was perhaps due to its higher degree of precision, in comparison with Qi Men Dun Jia.

As is true with Qi Men Dun Jia, Da Liu Ren was first used in China for the purposes of devising military strategy and later developed into a more popular and widespread form of divination which grew to include medical divination, matchmaking, childbirth, travel, criminology, weather forecasting, etc. types of divination.

In view of its complex nature, Da Liu Ren was regarded as the highest of the Three Styles, since mastery of its complex rule structure required many years of memorization. In contemporary China, few claim mastery of Da Liu Ren, while aging masters worry that younger generations of Chinese will disdain Da Liu Ren and the practice will die out in China. Da Liu Ren is further complicated by the necessity of mastering a large body of rules and regulations which govern the relationships named above. Da Liu Ren contains perhaps four times as many rules as Qi Men Dun Jia, for example. The extant historical literature on Da Liu Ren by far surpasses that of Qi Men Dun Jia.

See also
Chinese astrology
Chinese astronomy
Chinese Classical Texts
Feng Shui
 Flying Star Feng Shui
I Ching & I Ching divination
Jiaobei & Poe divination
Kau Cim
Qi Men Dun Jia
Shaobing Song
Siku Quanshu
Tai Yi Shen Shu
Tui bei tu
Tung Shing

References

Further reading
Yijing

"Da Liu Ren Bi Jing" (大六壬必镜)
"Liu Ren Da Quan"(六壬大全 Encyclopedia of Liu Ren), published in the Siku Quanshu
 
"Lingtai jing," an astrological treatise preserved in the Daozang
 

Chinese books of divination
Chinese astrology
Astrological texts
Taoist divination
History of astrology